Raumpatrouille – Die phantastischen Abenteuer des Raumschiffes Orion, also known as Raumpatrouille Orion, and Space Patrol Orion in English, was the first German science fiction television series. Its seven episodes were broadcast by ARD from 17 September 1966. Being a huge success with several reruns, audience ratings went up to 56%. Over the years, the series acquired a distinct cult status in Germany.

Premise
In the series, nations no longer exist and Earth is united. Flying saucers, such as spaceship Orion, are flown by humans, whilst the aliens fly fighter jet-like aircraft. The titular ship of the series title, "Spaceship Orion", (German: "Raumschiff Orion") is portrayed as being a fast space cruiser (German: Schneller Raumkreuzer), the newest starship in mankind's fleet and the fastest spacecraft ever created by humans.

The show tells the story of Commander Cliff Allister McLane (Dietmar Schönherr), an Earth starship captain and his loyal crew. He is Orion commander in the developing war against an alien race called the Frogs (so-called also in the German original). He is notoriously defiant towards his superiors.

Characters
Major Cliff Allister McLane (Dietmar Schönherr) is the commander of the Orion and a friend to most of its crewmen. He is a daredevil and hero who does not fight for money or glory, but for peace. He has been a member of Earth's space fleet for 15 years and was a soldier in at least one previous large-scale war (in the novels, these adventures of Cliff and his crew were described, too). As a running gag, McLane often has to destroy the spaceship Orion to save Earth, afterwards being awarded command of a better vessel (also named "Orion"). In the TV series it was shown only with the destruction of the Orion VII, though in the novels it went as far as to the Orion X-C.
Lt. Mario de Monti (Wolfgang Völz) is the computer specialist and gunner ("armament officer") of the Orion and a good friend of Commander McLane. He is often shown drinking with his friends and he is a womanizer who likes to flirt with young, attractive women (not even Tamara is safe from him, but she turned him down pretty heavily).
Lt. Atan Shubashi (Friedrich Georg Beckhaus) is the astrogator and star cartographer of the Orion. He is the owner of 264, one of the last 367 poodles that still exist on Earth.
Lt. Hasso Sigbjörnson (Claus Holm) is the Orion's engineer. He likes to drink and is the only crewmember who is married (his wife is named Ingrid and he always promises her to retire from active duty). He is an old friend of Commander McLane who usually helps him to explain to Ingrid why he can't retire after all.
Lt. Helga Legrelle (Ursula Lillig) is the surveillance and communication officer of the Orion. Like the other members of the crew, she dislikes Tamara Jagellovsk and feels monitored by her. Like Jagellovsk, Legrelle has a secret crush on Commander McLane and reacts very jealously whenever she notices Jagellovsk paying too much attention to him.
Lt. Tamara Jagellovsk (Eva Pflug) is a member of the GSD ("Galaktischer Sicherheitsdienst", German for "Galactic Security Service", the military intelligence service) who has been given the task of keeping McLane under control. Tamara likes McLane, however, and is very amused by his sense of humour. The Crew at first strongly dislike her, but with time they develop a feeling of mutual respect. Tamara can issue "Alpha Orders" which are orders of highest priority that have to be obeyed by McLane at all cost.
Frogs are a highly advanced and very intelligent, energy-like race of extraterrestrial conquerors who are attempting to destroy Earth's space fleet and eliminate mankind. They have extremely fast starships and powerful energy-weapons. Some of their technological abilities are superior to Earth's, but oxygen is poisonous to them. In the novels, it is finally revealed what they called themselves: Uraceel.
General Winston Woodrov Wamsler (Benno Sterzenbach) is McLane's commanding officer while McLane is demoted to 3 years of space patrol duty at the TRAV ("Terrestrische Raumaufklärungsverbände", "Terran Space Reconnaissance Division").
General Lydia van Dyke (Charlotte Kerr) was Cliff's original commanding officer when McLane was still at the "Schnelle Kampfverbände" ("Fast Battle Cruiser Division") and she expected him "not to resign like a sulking space cadet" when he was demoted, but to return to her fleet after his 3 years of patrol duty. She is also the commanding officer of the space ship Hydra.
Oberst (= Colonel) Hendryk Villa (Friedrich Joloff) is the head of the GSD ("Galaktischer Sicherheitsdienst", "Galactic Security Service") and thus the boss of Lt. Tamara Jagellovsk.
Lt. Michael Spring-Brauner (Thomas Reiner) is the adjutant of Gen. Wamsler and has a strong dislike towards McLane and his crew (which is mutual). He is a stuck-up bureaucrat and tries to make McLane's life as miserable as he can.
Space Marshal Kublai Krim (Hans Cossy) is the commanding officer of the Earth Space Forces (Kommandeur der Raumstreitkräfte).
Sir Arthur (Franz Schafheitlin) is the head of the Earth Space Forces (Oberbefehlshaber der Raumstreitkräfte).
von Wennerstein (Emil Stöhr) is a representative of the Earth government.

Fictional technology in Space Patrol
Astrodisc (German "Astroscheibe") is a viewing screen that can produce holographic images of space. It has the same function as the bridge screen of the Enterprise in Star Trek. The astrodisc stands in the middle of the Orion's bridge.
Light thrower batteries (German "Lichtwerferbatterie") are the weapons most frequently used by Earth's space fleet and the ships of the Frogs. These weapons appear in many different sizes, ranging from hand lasers to planet destruction-cannons. Orion was the first German production to feature the English word "laser".
Antimatter bombs are bombs containing antimatter and were used in the attempt to destroy the "Supernova" in the 2nd episode ("Planet außer Kurs", Planet off Course).
Overkill is a new weapon that was introduced in the 4th episode ("Deserteure"), and that was installed on the Orion as the first Earth space ship. It seems to be a disintegrator-style weapon that is able to obliterate large parts of a planet and cause enormous craters hundreds of kilometres wide.
ASG wrist communication devices (in German: "Armbandsprechgerät") are part of the technology of Earth's space fleet. They are compact com devices that are worn around the wrists.
Robots (German "Roboter") are helpers, guards and even housekeepers in the world of tomorrow. Their use is shown to be problematic, because they are depicted as suffering from frequent malfunctions, making them dangerous to human beings (especially if they are battle robots). They first appear in the series in episode 3 "Keepers of the Law" as saucer-shaped mining machines quasi-levitating on one bow-leg. They are constrained by Isaac Asimov's Three Laws of Robotics, about which a lecture is given at the beginning of the episode. Later they appear as androids and floating battle robots. Some of the humanoid robots are very similar in design to the modern, Vietnamese robot TOPIO.
Deep sea bases (German "Tiefseebasis") are giant cities located under water. They are modern, beautiful and have big windows to allow the people to see fish and other underwater life forms. The Orion usually starts and lands at Basis 104 which is located in the Gulf of Carpentaria, Australia.
Faster-than-light-engine (German "Überlichtantrieb") is the main drive that allows the crew to traverse the universe at speeds faster than light. The Frogs use a similar but superior technology, with the result that their spacecraft can out-pace the ships of the Space Patrol.
Magnet shield (German "Magnetschild") is a protective shield which is used by the Frogs. The Shield appears as a powerful energy-bowl that encircles the starship.

Special effects and set decoration

Many of the special effects seen in the black-and-white series, like the underwater casino and space port, were created by means of the Schüfftan process.

As the series' budget was comparatively low, the set designers resorted to using modified common everyday objects; for instance, electric irons, inverted clock pendulums, washing-machine console parts and designer pencil sharpeners were used as props control panels, sewing thread coils and banana plugs as futuristic machine parts, and plastic cups as ceiling lights. Many panels were produced by the then-newly invented thermoforming process. Much designer furniture was also used, notably Ludwig Mies van der Rohe's 258-type couch, Harry Bertoia's Diamond-type armchair, Yrjö Kukkapuro's Karuselli-type armchair,
Charles Eames's Aluminium group #EA105 chair, George Nelson's DAF Chair and Eero Saarinen's Tulpe table/chair combo. Joe Colombo's famous Smoke-type drinking glasses were used throughout the series.

Orion'''s cockpit was a 2.50m high, 10m wide interior set, built within a 28m exterior diameter sound stage. It stood on a 60 cm high metal tube construction to hide the 10,000m cable harness that connected its 3,200 flashing light bulbs to a 40 kg, electric motor-driven pinned-barrel mechanical sequencer.

The stage designer was Rolf Zehetbauer, who later won an Academy Award for his work on Cabaret.

"We had no money available and yet we were instructed to produce an elaborate science-fiction series. We were forced to improvise in all aspects. This ruled out completely manufacturing the spaceship's equipment from scratch. So we used existing things that we could adapt," is how Zehetbauer described the design work of the set.

Production
Rumours about the considerable costs of the series having led to its termination after only seven episodes were denied by the widow of the Orions original screenwriter, implying that it was planned from the start to have only seven installments. More episode screenplays were written than were filmed. No official reason was given for not producing a second series of episodes, but there are several reasons that were aired in interviews many years later by those involved in the production. According to Hans Gottschalk, one of the executive producers, there was a "lack of exciting script ideas" at the time. Helmut Jedele, then boss of Bavaria Film, the production company, mentioned in hindsight that the company had already undertaken too much for its resources, both in terms of staff and finance.

Another factor in planning for a second series would have been filming in colour instead of black-and-white. While this would have been required for a successful international marketing of an extension, the German production companies were not yet prepared for the necessary investment for the new equipment.

German television started to transmit in colour (PAL) a year later in 1967, but that was a slow gradual switch-over process from black-and-white over a course of several years, until the 1970s.

Yet another impediment might have been that the controllers in charge at the state television channel ARD feared accusations of an excess of "militarism" and a portrayal of a system "akin to fascism". While this might seem far-fetched for foreigners, this issue was and is very sensitive in Germany with regards to the past history of the country, and executive producer Helmut Krapp admitted that the issue was considered and taken seriously.

Co-production with French ORTF Television

Originally WDR, headquartered in Cologne, the largest regional broadcasting channel within ARD public TV consortium, was the sole commissioning producer on behalf of ARD group and in that position to provide complete production funding. However, the planned budget of up to 360,000 DM for each episode was considered too high by the WDR controllers. Bavaria Film chief Helmut Jedele looked for a co-producer to share some of the cost and came to an agreement with French national state TV channel ORTF. They contributed about 20% to production funding and some scenes, notably in episode 5, were re-shot for the French audience using French actors. In France the title of the series was "Commando spatial - Les aventures fantastiques du vaisseau Orion".

Novelizations
145 novels based on and continuing the series were published over the years, often with settings which were considerably different from those seen in the series.

Feature film
A movie composed of various scenes from the original series, together with some new footage, debuted in 2003 but did not match the success of the original series. As described by Dietmar Schönherr in an interview, the series had tried to deal with serious issues, a fact appreciated by many of its viewers. The movie's producers tried to replicate the series in trash culture style, however, thereby alienating much of the original fan base. The title of the movie was "Raumpatrouille Orion – Rücksturz ins Kino". The storyline was about the invasion and attacks of the Frogs, the term now becoming an acronym for "Feindliche Raumverbände ohne galaktische S'eriennummer" (roughly Hostile Space Combat Units Without Galactic Serial Identification Number). This description appears for the first time in the film and contradicts the series, where Atan Shubashi and Hasso Sigbjörnson, who were the first humans to see the Frogs, called them "Frösche" (German for frogs) first, but later switched to the English translation because "Frösche" sounded too familiar to describe the aliens.

Soundtrack and introduction

The emblematic soundtrack was composed by Peter Thomas.

The voice-over introduction (similar to that used in Star Trek the same year), set both tone and atmosphere of the series.

Voice-over introduction in German:"Was heute noch wie ein Märchen klingt, kann morgen Wirklichkeit sein. Hier ist ein Märchen von Übermorgen: es gibt keine Nationalstaaten mehr. Es gibt nur noch die Menschheit und ihre Kolonien im Weltraum. Man siedelt auf fernen Sternen. Der Meeresboden ist als Wohnraum erschlossen. Mit heute noch unvorstellbaren Geschwindigkeiten durcheilen Raumschiffe unser Milchstraßensystem. Eins dieser Raumschiffe ist die ORION, winziger Teil eines gigantischen Sicherheitssystems, das die Erde vor Bedrohungen aus dem All schützt. Begleiten wir die ORION und ihre Besatzung bei ihrem Patrouillendienst am Rande der Unendlichkeit."English translation:"What may sound like a fairy tale today may be tomorrow's reality. This is a fairy tale from the day after tomorrow: There are no more nations. There is only mankind and its colonies in space. People have settled on faraway stars. The ocean floor has been made habitable. At speed still unimaginable today, space vessels are rushing through our Milky Way. One of these vessels is the ORION, a minuscule part of a gigantic security system protecting the Earth from threats from outer space. Let's accompany the ORION and her crew on their patrol at the edge of infinity." Episodes 

References

Sources
Josef Hilger (2003). Raumpatrouille. 
Jörg Kastner (1995). Raumpatrouille ORION. 
Jörg Kastner (1991). Das große Raumschiff Orion Fanbuch. Raumpatrouille Orion''. Bd.1, Wuppertal 1997,

External links

 
  Starlight Casino
  AC1000 - Raumpatrouille fan group
  Raumpatrouille Orion Rücksturz ins Kino (the movie)
  Raumpatrouille quiz
 English subtitles for all the episodes
 English review of the series

German drama television series
German science fiction television series
1966 German television series debuts
1966 German television series endings
Black-and-white television shows
German-language television shows
Space adventure television series
Alien invasions in television
Das Erste original programming
1960s science fiction television series